Baconianism may refer to:
Baconian method, scientific methods theorised by Francis Bacon
Baconian theory of Shakespeare authorship, the theory that Francis Bacon wrote the works of Shakespeare

See also
Francis Bacon (1561–1626), English philosopher
Baconian cipher, a method of steganography devised by Francis Bacon
Bacon mania, a trend of enthusiasm for bacon in the US and Canada